The Thomas Point Shoal Light, also known as Thomas Point Shoal Light Station, is a historic lighthouse in the Chesapeake Bay on the east coast of the United States, and the most recognized lighthouse in Maryland. It is the only screw-pile lighthouse in the bay which stands at its original site. The current structure is a 1½ story hexagonal wooden cottage, equipped with a foghorn as well as the light.

History
A stone lighthouse was constructed in 1825 on shore at Thomas Point by John Donahoo, Thomas Point Light. It was replaced in 1838 by another stone tower. The point was subject to continuing erosion (which would eventually bring down the lighthouse on the point in 1894), and in 1873 Congress appropriated $20,000 for the construction of a screw-pile structure out in the bay, Thomas Point Shoal Light . With an additional $15,000 appropriation in 1875, the light was built and activated in November of that year. It took 30 workers to set each cast iron beam  into the Chesapeake Bay's bottom.

Ice was a perpetual threat to screw-pile lights on the Chesapeake, and in 1877 the original lens was destroyed when it toppled by shaking from ice floes. This lens was replaced, and the additional piles and riprap were placed around the foundation in order to protect it. By 1964 it was the last manned light in the Chesapeake Bay, and it was not automated until 1986. It is currently the last unaltered screwpile cottage-type lighthouse on its original foundation in the Chesapeake Bay.

Preservation
Concerns for its preservation brought it a National Register of Historic Places listing in 1975 and National Historic Landmark status in 1999.

In 2004, ownership of the lighthouse passed to the city of Annapolis, Maryland, which now maintains the structure in conjunction with Anne Arundel County, Maryland, the Annapolis Maritime Museum, and the Chesapeake Chapter of the U.S. Lighthouse Society. In 2019, a Lighthouse Society spokesman said that the steel substructure, last replaced in the 1980s, is severely rusted and requires $300,000 in repairs. Fortunately, the cast iron screw pilings remain in sound condition,  "as good today as they were 144 years ago", said the Baltimore Sun in reporting on the needed funding in August 2019.

The United States Coast Guard continues to maintain the navigational aids at the Lighthouse. The lighthouse keeper's former living quarters are open to the public three months out of the year, through boat tours departing from Annapolis, organized by the U.S. Lighthouse Society.  Tickets are purchased on their web site.

References

Sources

Thomas Point Shoal Lighthouse - from Lighthousefriends.com

External links

 Thomas Point Shoal Lighthouse
 The Light in the Bay
U.S. Lighthouse Society
Chesapeake Bay Lighthouse Project - Thomas Point Shoal Light
, including photo from 1993, at Maryland Historical Trust

Lighthouses completed in 1875
Lighthouses on the National Register of Historic Places in Maryland
National Historic Landmarks in Maryland
Lighthouses in the Chesapeake Bay
National Historic Landmark lighthouses
Buildings and structures in Annapolis, Maryland
National Register of Historic Places in Annapolis, Maryland
Lighthouses in Anne Arundel County, Maryland
1875 establishments in Maryland